Pravin Darji is Gujarati essayist, poet, critic and editor from India. Spand (1976), Charvana (1976), Dayarama (1978) and Pratyagra (1978) are some of his known works. He was awarded Padma Shri in 2011.

Life
Pravin Darji was born on 23 August 1944 in Mahelol village in Panchmahal district of Gujarat, India. He completed SSC in 1961 and BA in Gujarati and Sanskrit in 1965. He completed MA in 1967 from Gujarat University and PhD in 1973. He taught Gujarati in Arts College in Modasa from 1965 to 1967. He joined Lunavada College as a Professor in 1967 and served there until his retirement. He served as a chairman of the University Book Production Board for a year. He briefly edited Shabdashrishti, a literary magazine of Gujarat Sahitya Akademi.

Pravin Darji married Ramila and they have two daughters and a son.

Works
Adakhe Padakhe (1982), Leelaparna (1984), Ghasna Phool (1990), Pancham (1996), Gata Zarana (1997), Madhyabinduna Kamp (2003), Dadami Te Chakshu (2004), Pariprashna (2005), Motino Charo, Ayakhana Ank (1988), Sannikat (1993), Darbhankur, Venurav are his collections of essays.

Chees (1973), Utsedh (1985), Io (2005) are his poetry collections. Chandanna Vriksh (1991) and Ka Katha (2005) are his biographical works. Himalayna Khole (2001) and Nava Desh, Nava Vesh (2003) are his travelogues.

His PhD thesis Nibandh: Swarup ane Vikas (on essays) was published in 1975. His other work on essays is Lalitnibandh (1986). His other works of criticism are Seema Parno Shabda (1990), Spand (1976), Charvana (1976), Dayaram (1978), Pratyagra (1978), Navalkatha Swarup (1986), Pashchat (1982), Vipula Cha Prithvi (1983), Kavyasang (2000), Purakalpan (1989), Irony (1995). He edited Gujarati Bhashani Ketlik Vishishta Vartao (1984), Gadya Sanchay Volume 2 (1982), Harishchandrana Kavyo (1983), 121 Gujaarti Vartao ane Vartakaro (1994), Niravrutt (2007). He co-edited Shabdashri (1980). He translated Saundaryo Hahu Janmya Nathi (1990).

Awards
He received Sanskar Award (1986), Hari Om Award (1988), Sanskritik Gaurav Award (2002), Anantrai Raval Criticism Award (2003), Sanskriti Award (2005), Kala Gurjari Award (2007), Sanskar Chandrak (1978), Viththalbhai Patel Suvarna Chandrak (1992), Premanand Suvarna Chandrak (2005), Dhanji Kanji Gandhi Suvarna Chandrak and Dahyabhai Patel Suvarna Chandrak. He also received Kumar Suvarna Chandrak in 2011. The Government of India honored him with the fourth highest civilian award of Padma Shri in 2011.

See also
 List of Gujarati-language writers

References

1944 births
Living people
Recipients of the Padma Shri in literature & education
Poets from Gujarat
Gujarati-language writers
Gujarati-language poets
People from Panchmahal district
20th-century Indian poets
20th-century Indian essayists
Indian travel writers
Indian literary critics
Indian editors
Recipients of the Ranjitram Suvarna Chandrak